This is a list of venues used for professional baseball in Oakland, California and neighboring cities including Alameda and Emeryville. The information is a compilation of the information contained in the references listed.

Oakland Baseball Grounds 
Home of:
Oakland - California League (1879) - back to Rec Grounds in SF 1880
San Francisco - California League (1879) - back to Rec Grounds in SF 1880
Location: 13th Street (south); 14th Street (north); Center Street (west); Kirkham Street (east)
Currently: Industry and small businesses

Alameda Athletic and Baseball Grounds a.k.a. Alameda Grounds
Home of:
Oakland Greenhood & Morans - California League (1886 only - moved to SF in 1887, back to OAK in 1890)
San Francisco Pioneers - California League (moved to SF in 1887)
Location: north of Central Avenue near the site of Neptune Beach; between 7th (later Webster) Street (west); and Page Street (east), in Alameda
Currently: Housing, small businesses, McDonald's

Emeryville Grounds
Home of: Oakland Colonels (formerly Greenhood & Morans) - California League (1890-91) 
Location: uncertain

Piedmont Grounds
Home of: Oakland Colonels - California League (1892-93)
Location: 24th Street (north) and Waverly Street (west); at north end of Lake Merritt near Piedmont Baths
Currently: Housing and small businesses

(San Francisco ballparks)
Home of:
Oakland Clamdiggers - California State League (1896-98)
Oakland Colts - Pacific States League (1898 only)

Freeman's Park
Home of:
Oakland Clamdiggers - California State League (1899-1902)
Oakland Oaks - Pacific Coast League (1903,1907-12)
Location: 59th Street (south, left field); San Pablo Avenue (east, third base); buildings and 61st Street (north, first base); Fremont Street (west, right field); in Emeryville
Currently: Housing

Idora Park
Home of:
Oakland Oaks - Pacific Coast League (1904-06)
San Francisco Seals - Pacific Coast League (1906 after SF earthquake)
Location: amusement park bounded by 56th Street (south); 58th Street (north); Telegraph Avenue (east); Shattuck Avenue (west)
Currently: Housing

ballpark(s) unknown
Home of:
Oakland Commuters - California State League (1906-07)
Oakland - Central California Baseball League (1910 part only)
Oakland - Central California Baseball League (1911 part only)

Grove Street Park
Home of: several local teams about 1909-1918
Location: 57th Street and Grove Street (now Martin Luther King Jr. Way)

Oaks Park a.k.a. Emeryville Park
Home of:
Oakland Oaks - Pacific Coast League (1913-55)
San Francisco Seals - PCL (1914 only)
?Oakland - California State League (1915 only)
Location: 1120 Park Avenue (south, left field); San Pablo Avenue (east, third base); 45th Street (north, first base); Watts Street (west, right field); in Emeryville
Currently: Pixar Studios

Oakland Coliseum a.k.a. RingCentral Coliseum, prev. several other names, orig. Oakland–Alameda County Coliseum
Home of:
Oakland Athletics - American League (1968-present)
Location: 7000 Coliseum Way and Nimitz Freeway (I-880) (southwest, home plate); Damon Slough (northwest and northeast, left and center fields); end of Baldwin Street (east, right field)

See also
Lists of baseball parks
List of baseball parks in San Francisco, California

Sources
Peter Filichia, Professional Baseball Franchises, Facts on File, 1993.
Phil Lowry, Green Cathedrals,  several editions.
Michael Benson, Ballparks of North America, McFarland, 1989.

External links
Additional info
express.wordpress.com/2019/03/15/where-they-cut-their-teeth-the-oakland-giants-of-grove-street-park/ Grove Street Park

 
Sports venues in Alameda County, California
Baseball
Oakland, California
Baseball parks
Sports venues in Oakland, California